Reflections is a compilation album by US pop group The Carpenters. It was released in 1998 and rather than contain their greatest hits, this compilation includes remixes of their lesser known songs, that either did not do well on the charts or were not released as singles.

Track listing
"I Need to Be in Love"
"I Just Fall in Love Again"
"Baby It's You" (Remix)
"Can't Smile Without You" (single version)
"Beechwood 4-5789"
"Eve" (Remix)
"All of My Life" (Remix)
"Reason to Believe" (Remix)
"Your Baby Doesn't Love You Anymore"
"Maybe It's You" (Remix)
"Ticket to Ride"
"Sweet, Sweet Smile"
"A Song for You"
"Because We Are in Love (The Wedding Song)"

The Carpenters compilation albums
1998 compilation albums